Kylie Hilder (born 1 April 1976) is an Australian former rugby league footballer who is head coach of the New South Wales Women's State of Origin team.

As a player, she represented Australia and New South Wales, and played for the Roosters in the NRL Women's Premiership.

Playing career
Before switching to rugby league, Hilder was an Australian touch football representative. She won four Touch Football World Cups for Australia, two in the Women's Open division in 2003 and 2007 and two in the Mixed Open division in 2011 and 2015.

In 2009, she began playing rugby league for the Forestville Ferrets and was selected to represent New South Wales and Australia. In 2010, she represented New South Wales again before returning to touch football.

In 2017, after returning to rugby league, she was named in the New South Wales squad but did not play in their game against Queensland. In June 2018, she represented NSW Country at the inaugural Women's National Championships. On 17 June 2018, she was one of the Sydney Roosters first 15 signings for their NRL Women's Premiership team.

In May 2019, she again represented NSW Country at the Women's National Championships. On 21 June 2019, at 43-years old, Hilder played for New South Wales for the first time in nine years, coming off the bench in a 14–4 win over Queensland.

She announced her retirement after the game. On 13 November 2020, Hilder came out of retirement to play for New South Wales in their State of Origin loss to Queensland. She retired again after the game.

Coaching career
In February 2020, Hilder coached the Sydney Roosters at the NRL Nines in Perth. On 24 June 2020, Hilder was announced as an assistant coach for the Roosters' NRL Women's Premiership team.

On 24 February 2021, Hilder was announced as head coach of the New South Wales Women's State of Origin.

References

External links
NSWRL profile

1976 births
Living people
Australian female rugby league players
Australia women's national rugby league team players
Rugby league hookers
Sydney Roosters (NRLW) players